Chester Borough is a borough in Morris County, New Jersey, United States. As of the 2010 United States Census, the borough's population was 1,649, reflecting an increase of 14 (+0.9%) from the 1,635 counted in the 2000 Census, which had in turn increased by 421 (+34.7%) from the 1,214 counted in the 1990 Census.

The borough is completely surrounded by Chester Township. making it part of 21 pairs of "doughnut towns" in the state, where one municipality entirely surrounds another. The borough's name is derived from the township, which was named for Chestershire in England.

In 2010, Forbes ranked Chester at 321st in its listing of "America's Most Expensive ZIP Codes," with a median home price of $823,691.

History
Chester Township was established as a separate political entity on April 1, 1799, including the area of both the Township and the downtown settlement which came to be the Borough. The Borough of Chester was incorporated by an act of the New Jersey Legislature on April 3, 1930, based on the results of a referendum held on April 25, 1930, and is today a separate municipality surrounded entirely by Chester Township. 

The borough's name is derived from the township, which was named for Chestershire in England.

Geography
According to the United States Census Bureau, the borough had a total area of 1.59 square miles (4.13 km2), including 1.59 square miles (4.12 km2) of land and <0.01 square miles (<0.01 km2) of water (0.13%).

The borough is completely surrounded by Chester Township. making it part of 21 pairs of "doughnut towns" in the state, where one municipality entirely surrounds another.

Demographics

Census 2010

The Census Bureau's 2006–2010 American Community Survey showed that (in 2010 inflation-adjusted dollars) median household income was $86,705 (with a margin of error of +/− $12,175) and the median family income was $133,250 (+/− $8,752). Males had a median income of $84,167 (+/− $38,424) versus $50,341 (+/− $9,122) for females. The per capita income for the borough was $48,565 (+/− $4,792). About none of families and 2.7% of the population were below the poverty line, including none of those under age 18 and 10.5% of those age 65 or over.

Census 2000

As of the 2000 United States Census there were 1,635 people, 609 households, and 426 families residing in the borough. The population density was 1,063.0 people per square mile (409.9/km2). There were 627 housing units at an average density of 407.6 per square mile (157.2/km2). The racial makeup of the borough was 94.68% White, 0.80% African American, 1.71% Asian, 2.02% from other races, and 0.80% from two or more races. Hispanic or Latino of any race were 6.85% of the population.

There were 609 households, out of which 34.0% had children under the age of 18 living with them, 60.6% were married couples living together, 6.1% had a female householder with no husband present, and 29.9% were non-families. 23.8% of all households were made up of individuals, and 14.0% had someone living alone who was 65 years of age or older. The average household size was 2.66 and the average family size was 3.15.

In the borough the population was spread out, with 24.8% under the age of 18, 5.7% from 18 to 24, 30.0% from 25 to 44, 25.8% from 45 to 64, and 13.6% who were 65 years of age or older. The median age was 39 years. For every 100 females, there were 100.4 males. For every 100 females age 18 and over, there were 95.7 males.

The median income for a household in the borough was $80,398, and the median income for a family was $106,260. Males had a median income of $76,772 versus $45,833 for females. The per capita income for the borough was $42,564. About 2.1% of families and 5.2% of the population were below the poverty line, including 0.5% of those under age 18 and 5.8% of those age 65 or over.

Parks and recreation

Dense forests and hiking trails surround the town of Chester. It was named one of the top ten most beautiful towns in New Jersey in 2016. There are various recreational state parks, such as Hacklebarney State Park and Black River County Park, which contains a popular tourist site called the Nathan Cooper Gristmill. These parks serve as quintessential family activities, especially going on hikes and observing the foliage during the fall.

Government

Local government
Chester is governed under the Borough form of New Jersey municipal government, which is used in 218 municipalities (of the 564) statewide, making it the most common form of government in New Jersey. The governing body is comprised of the Mayor and the Borough Council, with all positions elected at-large on a partisan basis as part of the November general election. The Mayor is elected directly by the voters to a four-year term of office. The Borough Council is comprised of six members elected to serve three-year terms on a staggered basis, with two seats coming up for election each year in a three-year cycle. The Borough form of government used by Chester is a "weak mayor / strong council" government in which council members act as the legislative body with the mayor presiding at meetings and voting only in the event of a tie. The mayor can veto ordinances subject to an override by a two-thirds majority vote of the council. The mayor makes committee and liaison assignments for council members, and most appointments are made by the mayor with the advice and consent of the council.

, the Mayor of Chester is Republican Janet G. Hoven, whose term of office ends December 31, 2022. Members of the Chester Borough Council are Karen L. Ferrone (R, 2022), Russell Goodwin (R, 2022), Elizabeth Gugliemini (R, 2023), Christopher K. Heil (R, 2024), Kyle J. Holman (R, 2024) and Gary W. Marshuetz (R, 2023).

Merger discussion with Chester Township
In 2007, New Jersey Governor Jon Corzine created incentives for small towns of less than 10,000 inhabitants to combine with other cities.  The goal was to reduce the overall cost of government and thereby offer some tax relief. "New Jersey has 21 counties, 566 municipalities and 616 school districts, and property taxes average $6,800 per homeowner, or twice the national average."

Chester Borough had originally split from Chester Township in 1930 over the creation of sewer and water infrastructure in the more densely settled center of the municipality. The residents of the rural portions of the Township did not wish to financially support the construction and maintenance of a public sewer or water utility. Since that time rural Chester Township has relied upon individual private wells for water and septic systems for wastewater treatment while the Borough is primarily, although not entirely, served by public sewer and water. Concerns over the extension of utilities into the rural Township with the resultant potential for large scale growth served as an impediment to consolidation. The prohibition of utility extensions supported by the New Jersey state plan and codified in the Highlands Water Protection Act, along with the development restrictions contained in the Highlands Act have lessened those concerns. Additionally, an aggressive land conservation program in the Township has resulted in over 40% of the  Township being placed into permanent preservation, further lessening worries about potential overdevelopment. The two municipalities currently share a common K–8 school district, volunteer fire department, library, first aid squad and other municipal services.  Some residents are concerned about the unknown costs of a merger and a disproportionate allocation of those costs.

The two mayors had publicly endorsed a cost–benefit analysis of a merger. As two previous efforts had failed, the two municipalities have taken and deliberate approach to determine the savings, if any.

A merger vote planned for November 2010 was delayed for at least a year after Governor Christie's elimination of equalization funds that would ensure some taxpayers do not pay more due to the merger, as an analysis by the New Jersey Department of Community Affairs estimated that township residents would see an annual increase of $128 on their property taxes while those in the borough would see an average decline of $570 in their taxes.

Federal, state and county representation
Chester Borough is located in the 7th Congressional District and is part of New Jersey's 25th state legislative district. Prior to the 2011 reapportionment following the 2010 Census, Chester Borough had been in the 24th state legislative district.

 

Morris County is governed by a Board of County Commissioners comprised of seven members who are elected at-large in partisan elections to three-year terms on a staggered basis, with either one or three seats up for election each year as part of the November general election. Actual day-to-day operation of departments is supervised by County Administrator, John Bonanni. , Morris County's Commissioners are
Commissioner Director Tayfun Selen (R, Chatham Township, term as commissioner ends December 31, 2023; term as director ends 2022),
Commissioner Deputy Director John Krickus (R, Washington Township, term as commissioner ends 2024; term as deputy director ends 2022),
Douglas Cabana (R, Boonton Township, 2022), 
Kathryn A. DeFillippo (R, Roxbury, 2022),
Thomas J. Mastrangelo (R, Montville, 2022),
Stephen H. Shaw (R, Mountain Lakes, 2024) and
Deborah Smith (R, Denville, 2024).
The county's constitutional officers are the County Clerk and County Surrogate (both elected for five-year terms of office) and the County Sheriff (elected for a three-year term). , they are 
County Clerk Ann F. Grossi (R, Parsippany–Troy Hills, 2023),
Sheriff James M. Gannon (R, Boonton Township, 2022) and
Surrogate Heather Darling (R, Roxbury, 2024).

Politics
As of March 23, 2011, there were a total of 1,038 registered voters in Chester, of which 188 (18.1%) were registered as Democrats, 500 (48.2%) were registered as Republicans and 350 (33.7%) were registered as Unaffiliated. There were no voters registered to other parties.

In the 2012 presidential election, Republican Mitt Romney received 64.4% of the vote (506 cast), ahead of Democrat Barack Obama with 34.7% (273 votes), and other candidates with 0.9% (7 votes), among the 789 ballots cast by the borough's 1,092 registered voters (3 ballots were spoiled), for a turnout of 72.3%. In the 2008 presidential election, Republican John McCain received 60.6% of the vote (517 cast), ahead of Democrat Barack Obama with 37.7% (322 votes) and other candidates with 1.2% (10 votes), among the 853 ballots cast by the borough's 1,102 registered voters, for a turnout of 77.4%. In the 2004 presidential election, Republican George W. Bush received 66.7% of the vote (570 ballots cast), outpolling Democrat John Kerry with 31.7% (271 votes) and other candidates with 1.2% (13 votes), among the 855 ballots cast by the borough's 1,122 registered voters, for a turnout percentage of 76.2.

In the 2013 gubernatorial election, Republican Chris Christie received 79.9% of the vote (437 cast), ahead of Democrat Barbara Buono with 18.8% (103 votes), and other candidates with 1.3% (7 votes), among the 556 ballots cast by the borough's 1,110 registered voters (9 ballots were spoiled), for a turnout of 50.1%. In the 2009 gubernatorial election, Republican Chris Christie received 69.7% of the vote (439 ballots cast), ahead of  Democrat Jon Corzine with 21.6% (136 votes), Independent Chris Daggett with 7.1% (45 votes) and other candidates with 1.0% (6 votes), among the 630 ballots cast by the borough's 1,079 registered voters, yielding a 58.4% turnout.

Houses of worship 
The First Congregational Church, at 30 Hillside Road, has been active since 1740. This historic church building is listed on the National Register of Historic Places.

Grace Bible Chapel, located at 100 Oakdale Road in Chester, is a non-denominational fellowship of evangelical Christians.

Education

Students in public school for pre-kindergarten through eighth grade attend the Chester School District, together with children from Chester Township. As of the 2020–2021 school year, the district, comprised of three schools, had an enrollment of 1,047 students and 106.1 classroom teachers (on an FTE basis), for a student–teacher ratio of 9.9:1. Schools in the district (with 2020–2021 enrollment data from the National Center for Education Statistics) are 
Dickerson Elementary School with 317 students in grades Pre-K–2, 
Bragg Elementary School with 325 students in grades 3–5 and 
Black River Middle School with 402 students in grades 6–8. Dickerson and Bragg Schools are located on County Route 510, east of Chester Borough; Black River Middle School is on County Route 513 (North Road), north of Chester Borough. As a consolidated school district, all residents in the two constituent municipalities vote for board of education members who represent the entire district, not just the municipality in which they reside.

Students in public school for ninth through twelfth grades in both communities attend West Morris Mendham High School, which serves students from the surrounding Morris County school districts of Chester Borough, Chester Township, Mendham Borough and Mendham Township. The high school is part of the West Morris Regional High School District, which also serves students from Washington Township, who attend West Morris Central High School As of the 2020–2021 school year, the high school had an enrollment of 1,142 students and 91.9 classroom teachers (on an FTE basis), for a student–teacher ratio of 12.4:1. The district's board of education is comprised of nine members who are elected directly by voters to serve three-year terms of office on a staggered basis. The nine seats on the board of education are allocated based on the populations of the constituent municipalities, with one seat assigned to Chester Borough.

Transportation

Roads and highways

Chester is located at the point where County Route 513 (also known as old Route 24) and U.S. Route 206 intersect.

Public transportation
NJ Transit local bus service was provided on the MCM4 and MCM5 routes until June 2010, when NJ Transit pulled the subsidy.

Points of interest
 Chester House Inn, at the corner of Main Street and Hillside Road, listed on the National Register of Historic Places

Notable people

People who were born in, residents of, or otherwise closely associated with Chester Borough include:

 Lois Barker (1923–2018), utility player who played for the Grand Rapids Chicks of the All-American Girls Professional Baseball League during the 1950 season
 Alex Cable, optical engineer, inventor and entrepreneur who founded optical equipment manufacturer Thorlabs in his parents' basement in Chester
 Lester H. Clee (1888–1962), clergyman and politician who served in both houses of the New Jersey Legislature and served as the Mayor of Chester
 Matt Flanagan (born 1995), tight end for the Washington Redskins
 Fran Hopper (1922–2017), comic book artist active during the 1930s–1940s period known as the Golden Age of Comic Books, who was one of the earliest women in the field
 Larry W. Maysey (1946–1967), United States Air Force Pararescueman who was posthumously awarded the Air Force Cross, the Air Force's second-highest decoration
 Jared Stroud (born 1996), footballer who plays as a midfielder for New York Red Bulls II in the United Soccer League

References

External links

 Chester Borough website
 Chester School District
 
 School Data for the Chester School District, National Center for Education Statistics
 West Morris Mendham High School
 West Morris Regional High School District
 Daily Record regional area newspaper

 
1930 establishments in New Jersey
Borough form of New Jersey government
Boroughs in Morris County, New Jersey
Populated places established in 1930